Voevodivka is a village in eastern Ukraine, in Sievierodonetsk Raion of Luhansk Oblast, at about 110 km NW from the centre of Luhansk city, at the NNW border of Sievierodonetsk city and on the SE border of Rubizhne city.

Voevodivka was taken under control of Russian forces during the Russian invasion of Ukraine, on 11 May 2022.

See also
 Battle of Sievierodonetsk (2022)
 Battle of Rubizhne

References

External links

 Missile attacks, hardware, Wagner fighters: Enemy trying to break into Popasna. Ukrinform, 5 May 2022

Villages in Sievierodonetsk Raion